Central bank of Korea may refer to:
Bank of Korea, the central bank of South Korea
Central Bank of the Democratic People's Republic of Korea, the central bank of North Korea
Bank of Korea (1909–1950), the central bank of Korea under Japanese rule, and of South Korea under American occupation